The Ocean of Soul is the marching band representing Texas Southern University, and is currently under the direction of Brian K. Simmons.

History
The marching band at Texas Southern University (TSU) was founded in 1969 by Benjamin J. Butler II. Under the direction of Brian K. Simmons, the Ocean of Soul performs at all university home football, SWAC home basketball games, various parades and university sponsored events, on national television, and before crowds at professional athletic games.  The Ocean gained a reputation for its soulful sound, heavy beat, precision drills, and intricate dance routines.

Notable performances 

Besides TSU's televised football and select home basketball games, The Ocean has been featured in other events.

Several Pro Football games for the Houston Oilers and the Houston Texans.  Also the band has performed for the Dallas Mavericks fans in Dallas, Texas.
In 2004, the Ocean of Soul was featured in Super Bowl XXXVIII's halftime show along with the Spirit of Houston.

In 2005, The Ocean performed on the Stellar Awards with Kirk Franklin.

In 2008, The Ocean performed at their first Honda Battle of the Bands in the Georgia Dome. The Ocean was the only band to receive a standing ovation after performing that year.

In 2012, The Ocean of Soul's drumline, "The Funk Train", became the first black collegiate showstyle drumline in history to compete in the Percussive Arts Society International Convention (PASIC)'s Marching Festival. The drumline placed 3rd and gained an award for "Best Cymbal Line".

In 2014, The Ocean of Soul performed at the premiere of The Wedding Ringer in Houston. Co-star Kevin Hart accepted his invitation to become an honorary lifetime "Ocean" member at the event and donated $50,000 to the band.

Also in 2014, The Ocean of Soul performed at TSU alumnus Michael Strahan Pro Football Hall of Fame induction ceremony in Canton, Ohio.  Strahan donated $100,000 to the band for their outstanding support.

In 2016, The Ocean Of Soul performed the opening sequence for Fox Sports NFL Sunday in Houston, live on national television from Discovery Green.

In 2017, several members of The Ocean of Soul performed live with Solange for her performance of her hit single "Don't Touch My Hair" on campus. Also the band was invited to lead the celebration parade for the Houston Astros 2017 World Series Championship through downtown Houston that had 750,000 in attendance.

In 2019, members of The Ocean of Soul drumline opened up for Megan Thee Stallion for her sold out show at the White Oak Music Hall.

In 2021, the Ocean of Soul performed at halftime for the Houston Texans and the San Antonio Spurs.

In 2022, the Ocean of Soul performed at halftime for the Houston Rockets. Also the band was invited to WrestleMania 38 in Dallas to open up for Bianca Belair’s entrance.

Structure
With more than 200 members, The Ocean is the largest student organization on campus and a centerpiece of the university.  The "Ocean" is led by three drum majors and is based in the Rollins-Stewart Music building on campus.

Sections

The percussion section, known as The Funk Train Drumline, is the largest and most highly visible section of Ocean of Soul, followed by trumpets and trombones. The band also includes piccolos, clarinets, a full and powerful euphonium section, better known as Baditude, saxophones, mellophones, and high a powered sousaphone section, known as Platinum Funk.

The band is also noted for its talented dancers, the self-proclaimed "Class Act of The SWAC" better known as the Motion of The Ocean (also shortened to Motion). Motion has been in existence since 1969. Members of the Motion danceline received national publicity when they won a bid to compete on Season 5 of MTV's America's Best Dance Crew.

The flashy color guard (The Ocean Waves) and baton twirlers (The Platinum Girls) comprise related sections.

Leadership camp
Each summer, students attend the Band Leadership Camp, an intensive introduction to choreographed dance routines and flag drills, training in corps and show style marching techniques, music theory and leadership skills.

Legacy

Many former members of Ocean of Soul have achieved success in the music industry including
Grammy award-winning jazz saxophonist Kirk Whalum.
 Platinum Producer June James. (Key to the Streets by YFN Lucci)
 DJ Hollygrove, a nationally known mixtape DJ, current DJ on Core DJ Radio show on Shade 45, formerlyKQBT on-air personality.
 Clifton “Spug” Smith Tuba player for Grammy winning brass band Rebirth Brass Band
Actress Dominque Perry of Insecure on HBO
Kamau Marshall- Director of Strategic Communications for Joe Biden Joe Biden 2020 presidential campaign

Also a noticeable number of high school band directors are alumni of TSU’s marching band.

See also
Honda Battle of the Bands

References

External links
 - Ocean Of Soul Website

Texas Southern University
Musical groups from Houston
Southwestern Athletic Conference marching bands
Musical groups established in 1969
1969 establishments in Texas